German submarine U-743 was a Type VIIC U-boat of Nazi Germany's Kriegsmarine built for service during World War II. Her keel was laid down on 30 May 1942 by Schichau-Werke of Danzig. She was commissioned  on 15 May 1943 with Oberleutnant zur See Helmut Kandzior in command.

Design
German Type VIIC submarines were preceded by the shorter Type VIIB submarines. U-743 had a displacement of  when at the surface and  while submerged. She had two shafts and two  propellers.

U-743 was fitted with five  torpedo tubes (four fitted at the bow and one at the stern), fourteen torpedoes, one  SK C/35 naval gun, 220 rounds, and two twin  C/30 anti-aircraft guns. The boat had a complement of between forty-four and sixty.

Fate
On 20 August 1944 U-743 entered Trondheim for schnorkel repairs. She left the next day and was never heard from again. On 10 September 1944 U-743 was declared missing.

Previously recorded fate

References

Bibliography

External links

German Type VIIC submarines
World War II submarines of Germany
1943 ships
Ships built in Danzig
Ships built by Schichau
Missing U-boats of World War II
U-boats sunk in 1944